Jandals Away is a New Zealand comedy series that follows the Ofa family, who rescue people in return for free satellite TV to watch Warriors games. With a secret base on the tiny island of A'a'a, they call themselves The A'a'a Rescue Organisation or T.A.R.O. The show features a Mother and Father, two biological children, one adopted, and a dog named Spikes. We follow along as the family rescues people to reach their end goal of being able to watch The Warriors together. Lily, the middle child explores her sexuality over the course of the show. Maya, the adopted daughter helps Lily through this exploration through experimenting together. This young relationship blossoms while the family try to get the free satellite TV.

References

JANDALS AWAY COMMENCES WEEKDAYS MONDAY 3 JULY  4.30PM
Jandals Away at tvnz.co.nz

2000s New Zealand television series
2006 New Zealand television series debuts
2006 New Zealand television series endings
New Zealand children's television series
New Zealand comedy television series
Television shows funded by NZ on Air
TVNZ 2 original programming